L'accidia is an Italian black-and-white film. It was released in January 1919 by director Alfredo De Antoni. The film's title translates into English as "Sloth".

Plot
Engineer Ottavio Fortis returns to his homeland where nothing changes and laziness reigns, and there he meets Bianca again. Bianca, still unmarried, is considering a proposal that would make her become a duchess. Doubtful between love and wealth, she will have anyway something to regret.

External links

1919 films
Italian silent feature films
Italian black-and-white films